Round Trip is a 1969 album by Phil Woods, produced by Johnny Pate.

Reception

Ken Dryden reviewed the album for Allmusic and wrote that "Woods' playing is inspired, though some of the songs, including the title track, "Love Song for a Dead Che" and "I'm All Smiles" sound rather dated, as if they might have been appropriate for a movie soundtrack of the era. ...Woods' fans will want to pick this up".

Track listing 
 "Round Trip" (Ornette Coleman) – 2:59
 "Here's That Rainy Day" (Johnny Burke, Jimmy Van Heusen) – 4:01
 "Love Song for the Dead Che" (Joseph Byrd) – 2:51
 "I'm All Smiles" (Michael Leonard, Herbert Martin) – 3:09
 "(In My) Solitude" (Duke Ellington, Eddie DeLange, Irving Mills) – 2:44
 "How Can I Be Sure" (Eddie Brigati, Felix Cavaliere) – 2:52
 "Fill the Woods with Laughter" (Johnny Pate) – 4:03
 "This Is All I Ask" (Gordon Jenkins) – 3:32
 "Flowers" (Woods) – 3:23
 "Come out with Me" (Woods) – 5:24
 "Guess What?" (Woods) – 2:50

Personnel 
Phil Woods – arranger, alto saxophone
Thad Jones – flugelhorn, trumpet
Jerry Dodgion – flute
Tony Studd – bass trombone
Ray Alonge, James Buffington, Jimmy Cleveland – trombone
Romeo Penque, Jerome Richardson – woodwind
Henri Aubert, Julius Brand, Frederick Buldrini, Max Cahn, Paul Gershman, Emanuel Green, Julius Held, Leo Kahn, Harry Katzman, Joseph Malin, Dave Mankovitz, George Ockner, Raoul Poliakin, Max Pollikoff, Tosha Samaroff, Julius Schachter – violin
Julien Barber, Alfred Brown, Harold Coletta, Calman Fleisig – viola
Seymour Barab, Charles McCracken, Kermit Moore, George Ricci, Anthony Sophos – cello
Herbie Hancock, Roland Hanna – piano
Richard Davis – double bass
Grady Tate – drums
Gene Orloff, Chris Swansen – conductor

Production
Johnny Pate – arranger, producer
Val Valentin – engineer
Fred Seligo, Chuck Stewart – photography
Elaine Gongora – cover design
Suzanne White – design coordinator
Sung Lee – art direction, design
Tom Greenwood – production assistant
Carlos Kase – production coordination
Ben Young – research, restoration
Bryan Koniarz – supervisor

References

1969 albums
Albums produced by Johnny Pate
Phil Woods albums
Verve Records albums
Instrumental albums